SS John Harvey was a U.S. World War II Liberty ship. This ship is best known for carrying a secret cargo of mustard gas and whose sinking by German aircraft in December 1943 at the port of Bari in south Italy caused an unintentional release of chemical weapons.

The John Harvey was built by the North Carolina Shipbuilding Company in Wilmington, North Carolina, and launched on 9 January 1943. Her Maritime Commission Hull Number was 878, and she was rated as capable of carrying 504 soldiers. She was operated by Agwilines Inc

Bari incident

In August 1943, Roosevelt approved the shipment of chemical munitions containing mustard agent to the Mediterranean theater. On 18 November 1943 the John Harvey, commanded by Captain Elwin F. Knowles, sailed from Oran, Algeria, to Italy, carrying 2,000 M47A1 mustard gas bombs, each of which held 60–70 lb of sulfur mustard. After stopping for an inspection by an officer of the 7th Chemical Ordnance Company at Augusta, Sicily on 26 November, the John Harvey sailed through the Strait of Otranto to arrive at Bari.

Bari was packed with ships waiting to be unloaded, and the John Harvey had to wait for several days. Captain Knowles wanted to tell the British port commander about his deadly cargo and request it be unloaded as soon as possible, but secrecy prevented his doing so.

On 2 December 1943 German aircraft attacked Bari, killing over 1,000 people, and sinking 28 ships, including the John Harvey, which was destroyed in a huge explosion, causing liquid sulfur mustard to spill into the water, mixing with oil from the sunken ships, and a cloud of sulfur mustard vapor to blow over the city. Nearly all crewmen of John Harvey perished in the sinking; this prevented the rescuers from knowing the real nature of the danger until a M47A1 bomb fragment was retrieved from the wreckage.

A total of 628 military victims were hospitalized with mustard gas symptoms, and by the end of the month, 83 of them had died. The number of civilian casualties, thought to have been even greater, could not be accurately gauged since most had left the city to seek shelter with relatives.

Chemical warfare expert Dr. Stewart Francis Alexander found out about the mustard gas and gave the medics a correct treatment. While examining tissues collected on autopsied victims, he found out that mustard gas destroys white blood cells and other kinds of rapid dividing cells. This discovery was further investigated by pharmacologists, Louis S. Goodman and Alfred Gilman who used a mustard gas related agent, mustine, as the first chemotherapy treatment.

In order to try to cover-up the in-theater possession of chemical weapons by the Allies, the deaths were attributed to "burns due to enemy action". Reports were purged or classified but, since there were too many witnesses to keep the secret, in February 1944, the U.S. Chiefs of Staff issued a statement admitting to the accident and emphasizing that the U.S. had no intention of using chemical weapons except in the case of retaliation. U.S. records of the attack were declassified in 1959 and the British government admitted the poison gas release and harm caused to the surviving victims.

Details of the attack were given in a 1967 article in the US Navy journal Proceedings, and in a 1976 book by Glenn B. Infield, Disaster at Bari.

See also
 Geneva Protocol
 Chemical warfare

References

External links
A History Of Chemical Warfare
December 17, 1943 The Spokesman-Review account of Bari disaster 
 

Liberty ships
World War II shipwrecks in the Mediterranean Sea
Ships built in Wilmington, North Carolina
Ships sunk by aircraft during the air raid on Bari
Maritime incidents in December 1943
1942 ships